Paul Delbart (16 July 1901 – 30 April 1958) was a French racing cyclist. He rode in the 1928 Tour de France.

References

1901 births
1958 deaths
French male cyclists
Place of birth missing